László Fekete (14 April 1954 – 4 March 2014) was a Hungarian footballer of the 1970s and 1980s.

From 1974 to 1979 he made 21 appearances and scored 5 goals for the Hungarian National Football Team. He was the top scorer of the Hungarian league in 1978/79 with 31 goals, which meant that he received the Silver boot for being the second highest scoring player in Europe. He played as a striker.

Club career
He played for Újpesti Dózsa, Sturm Graz, Volán FC and Komlói Bányász. He was born in Budapest.

International career
Fekete made his debut for Hungary in a March 1974 friendly match against Bulgaria and had earned a total of 21 caps, scoring 5 goals. His final international was an October 1979 friendly match against the United States.

Death
He died on 4 March 2014 of natural causes, aged 59.

References

External links

hajralilak.hu – Bio page on Újpest fansite hajralilak.hu

1954 births
2014 deaths
Footballers from Budapest
Association football forwards
Hungarian footballers
Hungary international footballers
Nemzeti Bajnokság I players
Austrian Football Bundesliga players
Újpest FC players
Volán FC players
SK Sturm Graz players
Komlói Bányász SK footballers
Hungarian expatriate footballers
Expatriate footballers in Austria